Jeffrey may refer to:
 Jeffrey (name), including a list of people with the name
Jeffrey (1995 film), a 1995 film by Paul Rudnick, based on Rudnick's play of the same name
Jeffrey (2016 film), a 2016 Dominican Republic documentary film
Jeffrey's, Newfoundland and Labrador, Canada
Jeffrey City, Wyoming, United States
Jeffrey Street, Sydney, Australia
Jeffrey's sketch, a sketch on American TV show Saturday Night Live
Nurse Jeffrey, a spin-off miniseries from the American medical drama series House, MD
Jeffreys Bay, Western Cape, South Africa

People with the surname
 Alexander Jeffrey (1806–1874), Scottish solicitor and historian
Charles Jeffrey (footballer) (died 1915), Scottish footballer
E. C. Jeffrey (1866–1952), Canadian-American botanist
Grant Jeffrey (1948–2012), Canadian writer
Hester C. Jeffrey (1842–1934), American activist, suffragist and community organizer
Richard Jeffrey (1926–2002), American philosopher, logician, and probability theorist
Robin Jeffrey (active from 1967), Canadian academic
Tom Jeffrey (born 1938), Australian film and television director and producer

See also
 
 
 Geoffrey (disambiguation)
 Jeff, a given name (and list of people with the name)
 Jeffers
 Jeffery (disambiguation)
 Jeffreys
 Jeffries
 Peter Jeffrey (disambiguation)